National Submarine Memorial may refer to:
 National Submarine War Memorial, London, England
 National Submarine Memorial - East at Groton, Connecticut, United States
 National Submarine Memorial - West at Naval Weapons Station Seal Beach, United States